Robert Flanagan or Flanigan may refer to:

 Robert Flanagan (politician) (born 1945), American politician from Maryland
 Bob Flanagan (performance artist) (1952–1996), American performance artist and writer
 Bob Flanigan (singer) (1926–2011), American tenor vocalist and founding member of The Four Freshmen
 Bob Flanigan (footballer) (1914–1988), Australian rules footballer
 Bob Flanagan, programmer of the video game Marble Madness
 Rob Flanagan, contestant on season 2 of The Apprentice